Stefanie van Vliet (born 28 February 1967 in Amsterdam) is a Dutch politician of Democrats 66.

She was an MP from 1994 until 2002.

References

External links 
 Drs. S. (Stefanie) van Vliet, Parlement.com

1967 births
Living people
20th-century Dutch politicians
20th-century Dutch women politicians
21st-century Dutch politicians
21st-century Dutch women politicians
Democrats 66 politicians
Members of the House of Representatives (Netherlands)
Municipal councillors in North Holland
Politicians from Amsterdam
People from Aalsmeer
University of Amsterdam alumni